Pecorino siciliano DOP is an origin-protected firm sheep milk cheese from the Italian island and region of Sicily. This cheese comes from the classical Greek world: in ancient times it was recognized as one of the best cheeses in the world.

It is produced throughout the island, but especially in the provinces of Agrigento, Caltanissetta, Enna, Trapani and Palermo. It is a pecorino-style cheese, like its close relation pecorino romano, but not as well known outside Italy as the latter.

The cheese was awarded with the Denominazione di Origine Protetta in 1955 and EU protected designation of origin status in 1996.

References   

Italian cheeses
Cuisine of Sicily
Sheep's-milk cheeses
Italian products with protected designation of origin
Cheeses with designation of origin protected in the European Union
Ancient dishes